Paracladura is a genus of winter crane flies in the family Trichoceridae. There are more than 30 described species in Paracladura.

Species
These 38 species belong to the genus Paracladura:

 Paracladura antipodum (Mik, 1881)
 Paracladura aperta (Alexander, 1922)
 Paracladura chilensis Alexander, 1929
 Paracladura complicata Alexander, 1924
 Paracladura cuneata Alexander, 1928
 Paracladura curtisi Alexander, 1924
 Paracladura decussata Alexander, 1924
 Paracladura dolabella (Krzeminska, 2005)
 Paracladura dorsocompta Yang & Yang, 1995
 Paracladura edwardsi Alexander, 1929
 Paracladura elegans Brunetti, 1911
 Paracladura flavoides Alexander, 1923
 Paracladura gracilis Brunetti, 1911
 Paracladura harrisi Alexander, 1924
 Paracladura howesi (Alexander, 1923)
 Paracladura imanishii Tokunaga, 1938
 Paracladura kumaonensis Alexander, 1959
 Paracladura latipennis Alexander, 1930
 Paracladura lobifera (Alexander, 1922)
 Paracladura lyrifera (Alexander, 1923)
 Paracladura macrotrichiata (Alexander, 1922)
 Paracladura maori (Alexander, 1921)
 Paracladura minuscula Yang, 2003
 Paracladura nipponensis Alexander, 1924
 Paracladura obtusicornis (Alexander, 1922)
 Paracladura oparara Krzeminska, 2001
 Paracladura patagonica Alexander, 1929
 Paracladura pirioni Alexander, 1929
 Paracladura pusilla (Bigot, 1888)
 Paracladura rasnitsyni Krzeminska, 2005
 Paracladura scimitar Alexander, 1969
 Paracladura spicata Alexander, 1969
 Paracladura superbiens Alexander, 1960
 Paracladura trichoptera (Osten Sacken, 1877)
 Paracladura uriarra Krzeminska, 2003
 Paracladura williamsae Krzeminska, 2005
 Paracladura zheana Yang & Yang, 1995
 † Paracladura caucasiana Krzemiska & al., 2009

References

Further reading

 

Tipulomorpha genera
Articles created by Qbugbot